The 1954 Hong Kong Urban Council election was held on 24 March 1954 for the two of the four elected seats of the Urban Council of Hong Kong.

4,957 of about 13,700 eligible voters cast their votes, 3,887 ballots from the polling station at the Statue Square on Hong Kong Island and 1,070 from St. Andrew's Church on Kowloon. There were five candidates contesting in total. Two incumbents, Philip Au and Dr. Raymond Lee of the Reform Club were able to secure the seats they won in last year.

Results

Citations

References
 Pepper, Suzanne (2008). Keeping Democracy at Bay:Hong Kong and the Challenge of Chinese Political Reform. Rowman & Littlefield.
 Lau, Y.W. (2002). A history of the municipal councils of Hong Kong : 1883-1999 : from the Sanitary Board to the Urban Council and the Regional Council. Leisure and Cultural Service Dept.

1954 elections in Asia
1954 in Hong Kong
Urban
March 1954 events in Asia
1954 elections in the British Empire